Since Portugal's first international association football match in 1921 against Spain, there have been 28 occasions when a Portuguese player has scored three or more goals (a hat-trick) in a game. The first hat-trick was scored by Valdemar Mota against Italy in 1928. The record for the most goals scored in an international game by a Portuguese player is four, which has been achieved on five occasions: by Eusébio against North Korea at the 1966 World Cup, by Nuno Gomes against Andorra in 2002, by Pauleta against Kuwait in 2003, and the other two by Cristiano Ronaldo, the first against Andorra in 2016 and the second against Lithuania in 2019. In addition to Eusébio, the only other three Portuguese players to have scored a hat-trick at the World Cup finals were Pauleta in 2002 against Poland, Cristiano Ronaldo in 2018 against Spain, and Gonçalo Ramos in 2022 against Switzerland. Sérgio Conceição is the only Portuguese player to have scored a hat-trick at the European Championship finals. He scored the only three goals of the match against Germany at Euro 2000. 

Cristiano Ronaldo holds the record for the most hat-tricks scored by a Portuguese player, with ten between 2013 and 2021, with the next closest to him on the matter being Pauleta with 3. André Silva was the youngest Portuguese player to score a hat-trick, at the age of 20 years, 11 months and 4 days against the Faroe Islands.

Hat-tricks for Portugal

Hat-tricks conceded by Portugal

Notes

References 

Hat-tricks
Portugal
Portugal